Route 221 is a north–south highway in Quebec on the south shore of the St. Lawrence River, linking the US border south of Lacolle to Saint-Isidore.

The highway begins at the US border at the Overton Corners–Lacolle 221 Border Crossing, where it connects to New York State Route 276 (NY 276), and goes north, briefly running concurrently with Route 202 before reaching the urban area of Lacolle. It then continues north until Napierville where it goes west concurrently with Route 219 until they separate at Saint-Patrice-de-Sherrington, where Route 221 goes north toward Saint-Édouard. There it briefly goes roughly west via Saint-Michel and Saint-Rémi before turning northeast toward its terminus at Route 207 in the northern part of Saint-Isidore, just south of Autoroute 30.

References

External links 
 Provincial Route Map (Courtesy of the Quebec Ministry of Transportation) 
Route 221 on Google Maps

221